Abdullahi Ali Ahmed Waafow (died 27 July 2022) was a Somali general and politician who served in the 8th Transitional Federal Parliament of Somalia in the 2000s. A member of the Bimaal clan, Waafow later became the mayor (district commissioner) of the southern city of Merca in the Lower Shabelle region, a position he would hold until his assassination.

On 27 July 2022, Waafow was killed when an al-Shabaab suicide bomber ran up to him and detonated while Waafow was giving a speech outside an administrative office in Merca. Around twenty other people were also killed, mainly Waafow's advisors and security personnel. Waafow was targeted by al-Shabaab due to his support for AMISOM peacekeepers in Lower Shabelle.

References 

20th-century births
2022 deaths
Year of birth missing
Date of birth missing
Place of birth missing
21st-century Somalian politicians
Somalian generals
Members of the Transitional Federal Parliament
People from Lower Shebelle
Mayors of places in Somalia
Assassinated Somalian politicians
2022 murders in Somalia